Colin Niel Ackermann (born 4 April 1991) is a Dutch-South African cricketer who plays for Leicestershire County Cricket Club in England and the Netherlands national cricket team. He made his international debut for the Netherlands in October 2019.

He served as the Leicestershire club captain (2020-2022).

Early life
Ackermann was born on 4 April 1991 in George, Cape Province, South Africa. He studied at Outeniqua Primary School in George and Grey High School in Port Elizabeth. He was the vice-captain of South Africa at the 2010 Under-19 Cricket World Cup.

Domestic career
In the 2016 season, he scored the most runs in the 2016–17 Sunfoil Series, with a total of 883 from ten matches and seventeen innings.

Ahead of the 2017 season, Ackermann signed for English county side Leicestershire on a two-year contract. In May 2017, he was named Domestic Players' Player of the Season at Cricket South Africa's annual awards. In August 2017, he was named in Nelson Mandela Bay Stars' squad for the first season of the T20 Global League. However, in October 2017, Cricket South Africa initially postponed the tournament until November 2018, with it being cancelled soon after.

On 7 August 2019, in the 2019 t20 Blast in England, Ackermann took seven wickets for eighteen runs for Leicestershire against the Birmingham Bears. These were the best bowling figures in a Twenty20 cricket match. In April 2022, he was bought by the Manchester Originals for the 2022 season of The Hundred. In July 2022, in the County Championship, Ackermann scored his maiden double century in first-class cricket with 277 not out.

International career
In June 2019, Ackermann became available to play for the Netherlands cricket team, ahead of the 2019 ICC T20 World Cup Qualifier tournament in the United Arab Emirates. In September 2019, he was named in the Dutch squads for the 2019–20 Oman Pentangular Series and the 2019 ICC T20 World Cup Qualifier tournament. He made his Twenty20 International (T20I) debut for the Netherlands, against Ireland, on 5 October 2019.

In September 2021, Ackermann  was named as the vice-captain of the Dutch squad for the 2021 ICC Men's T20 World Cup. In November 2021, Ackermann was named in the Dutch One Day International (ODI) squad for their series against South Africa. He made his ODI debut on 26 November 2021, for the Netherlands against South Africa.

References

External links
 

1991 births
Living people
Dutch cricketers
Netherlands One Day International cricketers
Netherlands Twenty20 International cricketers
South African cricketers
Eastern Province cricketers
Leicestershire cricketers
Warriors cricketers
People from George, South Africa
South African emigrants to the Netherlands
Manchester Originals cricketers
Cricketers from the Western Cape